Patton is an unincorporated community in San Bernardino County, California, United States. Patton has a post office with ZIP code 92369, which opened in 1897.

It may be best known as the site for a large, state-run forensic psychiatric Patton State Hospital which was opened in 1893. DSH-Patton provides treatment to forensically and civilly committed patients within a secure treatment area.  As of 2020, the hospital operates with approximately 1,527 beds. The term "Patton" is oftentimes used as a joke for people in the area.  Local adolescents would tell each other, "you are so crazy, you belong in Patton".

References

Unincorporated communities in San Bernardino County, California
Unincorporated communities in California